Will Becher is a British animator and film director.

Animation career

Becher's first role was as an animator on Aardman's 2000 movie, Chicken Run, and has since worked on many films and TV shows including The Pirates!, ParaNorman and Shaun the Sheep. His directorial debut was the 2019 sequel, A Shaun the Sheep Movie: Farmageddon.

References

External links 

 

English film directors
Year of birth missing (living people)
Living people